Curse of Blackmoor Manor is the 11th game in the Nancy Drew point-and-click adventure game series by Her Interactive. The game is available for play on Microsoft Windows platforms as well as on DVD, Steam, and GOG.com released a digital version on their site. It has an ESRB rating of E for moments of mild violence and peril. Players take on the first-person view of fictional amateur sleuth Nancy Drew and must solve the mystery through interrogation of suspects, solving puzzles, and discovering clues. There are two levels of gameplay, Junior and Senior detective modes, each offering a different difficulty level of puzzles and hints; however neither of these changes affect the actual plot of the game. The game is loosely based on a book entitled The Bluebeard Room (1985).

Plot
Nancy Drew travels to England to visit Linda Penvellyn, her neighbor's daughter and newlywed wife of a British diplomat. Linda is currently living in Blackmoor Manor, a 14th-century mansion haunted by a tragic past. A mysterious malady keeps Linda hidden behind thick bed curtains. Is she hiding from something or someone, or is a more menacing threat stalking her? Nancy is tasked with solving this mystery by learning more about the family's history, exploring the mansion, and discovering the secrets of the family that have been hidden away for generations.

Development

Characters
Nancy Drew - Nancy is an 18-year-old amateur detective from the fictional town of River Heights in the United States. She is the only playable character in the game, which means the player must solve the mystery from her perspective.
Linda Penvellyn - Linda married Hugh Penvellyn and recently moved from the United States to England. She currently resides in Blackmoor Manor and refuses to let anyone see her face. She believes that she is cursed and fears that Nancy will be cursed as well. What is she hiding besides her face?
Jane Penvellyn - Jane is Linda's 12-year-old, attention-deprived stepdaughter. She is unhappy with her move to Blackmoor Manor because she enjoyed being raised in the U.S. Very curious and smart, she is knowledgeable about the manor's secrets — does she know more about Linda than she's saying?
Mrs. Drake - Mrs. Drake is Jane's great-aunt. She spends her days tending plants in the manor's conservatory. She puts up a no-nonsense attitude and is truly confounded and frustrated by the recent spate of events. Outwardly she scoffs at the issue of curses and witches, but she is superstitious herself.
Nigel Mookerjee - Nigel is a historian currently researching and cataloging the Blackmoor Manor library. Nigel is interested in writing a history of the Penvellyn family. Could he be the one who can help find the key to unlocking the past? But what's really behind his keen interest in the manor and its quirky inhabitants?
Ethel Bosinny - Ethel is Jane's tutor and comes from a long line of tutors to the Penvellyn Clan. She is very mysterious; her oh-so-charming demeanor has an edge that hints at something deeper. Is there something painful in her past, or is she hiding a secret?
Loulou - Loulou is an intelligent 80-year-old parrot who gives hints and loves "yummy cakes." She is a reference to the parrot in Gustave Flaubert's 1877 story Un coeur simple.

Cast
Nancy Drew / Loulou – Lani Minella
Mrs. Drake – Amy Broomhall
Jane Penvellyn – Conni Ellern
Linda Penvellyn – Jenn Ruzumna
Ethel Bosinny – Sarah Papineau
Nigel Mookerjee – Stephen Hando
Mrs. Petrov – Dora Lanier
Ned Nickerson – Scott Carty
Hugh Penvellyn / Tommy Tucker / Alan Penvellyn – Jonah von Spreekin
Paliki Vadas – Alyssa Keene
Max Holechek – 1930s Radio Announcer (Secret of the Old Clock trailer)

Reception

In the United States, Curse of Blackmoor Manors computer version sold between 100,000 and 300,000 units by August 2006. At that time, the combined sales of the Nancy Drew computer game series had reached 2.1 million sales in the United States alone. Remarking upon this success, Edge called Nancy Drew a "powerful franchise". Curse of Blackmoor Manor also received "generally favorable reviews" from critics, according to review aggregation website Metacritic. In 2011, Adventure Gamers named it the 99th-best adventure game ever released.

In The New York Times, Charles Herold praised Blackmoor Manors "intelligent game design", and considered its use of mini-games to be its only downside. He concluded that "clever puzzles and an interesting plot make it the best Nancy Drew game since The Final Scene". Jinny Gudmundsen of USA Today gave the game a 4 ½ stars out of five, saying "best for teens 13 and up because it's a little scarier, its puzzles are harder, and its themes of witchcraft, lycanthropy, and alchemy make it more appropriate for an older audience". Lonnie Brown of The Ledger also gave the game a positive review, saying "The graphics are well done, and the music and characters fit the mood" and called the "second chance" button a "very nice feature".

Laura MacDonald of Adventure Gamers gave the game a mixed review (4 out of 5 stars), complimenting the graphics, cinematics and animation but felt the "non-linear gameplay can leave a player lost if they don’t play a sustained game; though the story is well done, could have been more developed". However, she called it an overall "solid addition to the series and likely the best Nancy Drew game of them all...this is a definite buy".

Tally Ho of Just Adventure gave the game a positive review, calling the graphics "the best of the series" and enlarged playing are a "good thing". However, Ho thought "forcing the player to repeat a fairly difficult task again and again, even after beating it is really unfair".

References

External links
Official site (archived)

2004 video games
Detective video games
DVD interactive technology
Video games based on Nancy Drew
Point-and-click adventure games
Video games developed in the United States
Video games scored by Kevin Manthei
Video games set in England
Video games about witchcraft
Windows games
Her Interactive games
Single-player video games
North America-exclusive video games